Doddington is a civil parish in Cheshire East, England. It contains eight buildings that are recorded in the National Heritage List for England as designated listed buildings.  Of these, two are listed at Grade I, the highest grade, one is listed at Grade II*, the middle grade, and the others are at Grade II.  Much of the parish is occupied by Doddington Park, which contains all the listed buildings.  The major buildings are Doddington Hall and its predecessor, Delves Hall.  The other listed structures include stables and a boathouse associated with Doddington Hall, and Demesne Farm with associated buildings.

Key

Buildings

See also
Listed buildings in Hunsterson
Listed buildings in Checkley cum Wrinehill
Listed buildings in Lea
Listed buildings in Blakenhall
Listed buildings in Walgherton
Listed buildings in Hatherton

References
Citations

Sources

 

Listed buildings in the Borough of Cheshire East
Lists of listed buildings in Cheshire